Jacek Winnicki, (born 7 September 1967) is Polish basketball coach who is currently the head coach of MKS Dąbrowa Górnicza of the PLK.

Honors
 Śląsk Wrocław (1997-02) (Men's basketball, assistant coach)
Polish Basketball League: 1998, 1999, 2000, 2001, 2002
Polish Cup: 1997
 Śląsk Wrocław (2002–03) (Men's basketball, head coach)
 Asseco Gdynia (2003–07) (Men's basketball, assistant coach)
Polish Basketball League: 2004, 2005, 2006, 2007
Polish Cup: 2006
 Sportino Inowrocław (2007–08) (Men's basketball, head coach)
Polish 2nd Basketball League: 2008
 Lotos Gdynia (2008–10) (Women's basketball, head coach)
Polish Women's Basketball League: 2009, 2010
Polish Cup: 2010
 Turów Zgorzelec (2010–12) (Men's basketball, head coach)
 CCC Polkowice (2012–14) (Women's basketball, head coach)
Polish Women's Basketball League: 2013
Polish Cup: 2013
 Fenerbahçe Istanbul (2014-2015) (Women's basketball, head coach)
Turkish Super Cup: 2014
Turkish Cup: 2015

References

External links 
Profile @ dream-team-basketball.com
Profile @ eurobasketwomen2013.com
Profile @ FIBAeurope.com

Living people
1967 births
Fenerbahçe basketball coaches
Polish basketball coaches
Place of birth missing (living people)